The 2016–17 San Francisco Dons women's basketball team represents the University of San Francisco in the 2016–17 NCAA Division I women's basketball season. It is head coach Molly Goodenbour's first season at San Francisco. The Dons, members of the West Coast Conference, play their home games at War Memorial Gymnasium. They finished the season 18–13, 11–7 in WCC play to finish in fourth place. They advanced to the semifinals of the WCC women's tournament where they lost to Gonzaga.

Roster

Schedule and results

|-
!colspan=12 style="background:#006633; color:#FFCC33;"| Exhibition

|-
!colspan=9 style="background:#006633; color:#FFCC33;"| Non-conference regular season

|-
!colspan=9 style="background:#006633; color:#FFCC33;"| WCC regular season

|-
!colspan=9 style="background:#006633; color:#FFCC33;"| WCC Women's Tournament

See also
 2016–17 San Francisco Dons men's basketball team

References

San Francisco Dons women's basketball seasons
San Francisco
San Francisco Dons

San Francisco Dons
San Francisco Dons